Herman Heijermans (3 December 1864 – 22 November 1924), was a Dutch writer.

Heijermans was born in Rotterdam, into a liberal Jewish family, the fifth of the 11 children of Herman and Matilda (Moses) Spiers. Painter Marie Heijermans was his sister. 

In the Algemeen Handelsblad daily, he published a series of sketches of Jewish family life under the pseudonym of Samuel Falkland, which were collected in volume form. His novels and tales include Trinette (1892), Fles (1893), Kamertjeszonde (2 vols, 1896), Interieurs (1897), Diamantstad (2 vols, 1903). He created great interest by his play Op Hoop van Zegen (1900), an indictment of the exploitation of sea fishermen in the Netherlands at the turn of the century, represented at the Théâtre Antoine in Paris, and in English by the Stage Society as The Good Hope.

His other plays are: Dora Kremer (1893), Ghetto (1898), Het zevende Gebod (1899), Het Pantser (1901), Ora et labora (1901), and numerous one-act pieces. A Case of Arson, an English version of the one-act play Brand in de Jonge Jan, was notable for the impersonation (1904 and 1905) by Henri de Vries of all the seven witnesses who appear as characters.

Heijermans died in Zandvoort at age 59, and is buried at Zorgvlied cemetery.

References

External links
 
 
 

1864 births
1924 deaths
Dutch Jews
Social Democratic Workers' Party (Netherlands) politicians
Writers from Rotterdam
Dutch male short story writers
Dutch male novelists
Dutch male dramatists and playwrights
19th-century Dutch novelists
19th-century Dutch male writers
19th-century Dutch dramatists and playwrights
20th-century Dutch novelists
20th-century Dutch male writers
20th-century Dutch dramatists and playwrights
19th-century short story writers
20th-century Dutch short story writers